Trae Williams (born January 30, 1985) is a former American football cornerback. He was drafted by the Jacksonville Jaguars in the fifth round of the 2008 NFL Draft. He played college football at South Florida.

Williams has also been a member of the Philadelphia Eagles, Seattle Seahawks, Pittsburgh Steelers, Tampa Bay Buccaneers, and Buffalo Bills.

Early years

Williams attended and played high school football at Durant High School in Plant City, Florida.

College career
Williams attended the University of South Florida where he was a first and second-team all-Big East defensive back and a Thorpe Award candidate.

Professional career

Jacksonville Jaguars
Williams was drafted by the Jacksonville Jaguars in the fifth round of the 2008 NFL Draft. He was waived prior to the start of the 2008 season.

Philadelphia Eagles
Williams was signed to the Philadelphia Eagles practice squad where he stayed for the entire 2008 season. He was signed to the active roster on January 20, 2009. He was waived on September 5, 2009.

Seattle Seahawks
Williams was signed to the Seattle Seahawks practice squad on November 3, 2009.

Pittsburgh Steelers
Williams was signed off the Seahawks' practice squad by the Pittsburgh Steelers on December 29, 2009. He was waived on June 15, 2010.

Tampa Bay Buccaneers
Williams signed with the Tampa Bay Buccaneers on August 16, 2010.  He was cut by the Buccaneers on September 5, 2010.

Buffalo Bills
Williams was signed by the Buffalo Bills to the practice squad on November 29, 2010.

References

External links
Jacksonville Jaguars bio
Philadelphia Eagles bio
Pittsburgh Steelers bio
Seattle Seahawks bio
South Florida Bulls bio

1985 births
Living people
People from Thomasville, Georgia
Players of American football from Florida
American football cornerbacks
South Florida Bulls football players
Jacksonville Jaguars players
Philadelphia Eagles players
Seattle Seahawks players
Pittsburgh Steelers players
Tampa Bay Buccaneers players
Buffalo Bills players
People from Plant City, Florida
Durant High School (Florida) alumni